Habibpur refers to a census town in Bhagalpur, Bihar, India

Habibpur also refers to:
Habibpur, Malda, a village in Malda district, West Bengal, India
Habibpur (community development block), in Malda district, West Bengal,India
Habibpur (Vidhan Sabha constituency), in Malda district, West Bengal, India
Habibpur, Nadia, a village in Nadia district, West Bengal, India